The 1987–88 Louisville Cardinals men's basketball team represented the University of Louisville in the 1987–88 NCAA Division I men's basketball season. The head coach was Denny Crum and the team finished the season with an overall record of 24–11.

Roster

Schedule and results

|-
!colspan=9 style=| Regular season

|-
!colspan=12 style=| Metro Conference tournament

|-
!colspan=12 style=| NCAA tournament

Team players drafted into the NBA

Rankings

References 

Louisville Cardinals men's basketball seasons
Louisville
Louisville
Louisville Cardinals men's basketball, 1987-88
Louisville Cardinals men's basketball, 1987-88